Avgusta Tsybysheva (born 14 August 1988) is a retired Russian tennis player.

Tsybysheva has won one singles title and eight doubles titles on the ITF Women's Circuit in her career. On 14 June 2010, she reached her best singles ranking of world No. 423. On 24 March 2008, she peaked at No. 379 in the doubles rankings.

Tsybysheva made her WTA Tour main-draw debut at the 2008 İstanbul Cup in the doubles event, partnering Anastasia Poltoratskaya.

ITF finals

Singles (1–0)

Doubles (8–8)

External links
 
 

1988 births
Living people
Russian female tennis players